The Angolan giraffe (Giraffa angolensis or Giraffa camelopardalis angolensis or Giraffa giraffa angolensis), also known as the Namibian giraffe, is a species or subspecies of giraffe that is found in northern Namibia, south-western Zambia, Botswana, and western Zimbabwe.

Taxonomy 
A 2009 genetic study on this subspecies suggests the northern Namib Desert and Etosha National Park populations each form a separate subspecies. However, genetic studies based on mitochondrial DNA do not support the division into two subspecies., but could identify giraffes in southern Zimbabwe as the Angolan giraffe, suggesting a further eastward distribution than expected.

Description 
This subspecies has large brown blotches with edges that are either somewhat notched or have angular extensions. The spotting pattern extends throughout the legs but not the upper part of the face. The neck and rump patches tend to be fairly small. The subspecies also has a white ear patch.

Habitat 
Home range size of Angolan giraffes was found to be larger in unproductive areas such as the Namib Desert and much smaller in more productive areas such as Lake Manyara National Park. However, that home range size could be affected by abiotic(e.g climate), biotic(e.g forage availability, predator densities) and human influence(e.g population growth)

Seasonal movement  
As far as seasonal movements of giraffes were concerned, they were not as distinctive as those in other giraffe populations around the world. Male giraffe moves longer than female giraffe and also it has longer average daily movement (5.64km compared to 1.87km in 180 days during hot-dry season).

Foraged activity  
Angolan Giraffe tends to forage into the mountain during the cold-dry and early hot-dry season. It mainly eats Commiphora for living.

Conservation 
Approximately 13,000 animals are estimated to remain in the wild; and about 20 are kept in zoos.

References

External links
 
 

Angolan giraffe
Mammals of Southern Africa
Mammals of Angola
Mammals of Namibia
Mammals of Zambia
Mammals of Botswana
Mammals of Zimbabwe
Angolan giraffe